Calpain-6 (also known as calpamodulin) is a protein in humans that is encoded by the CAPN6 gene.

Calpains are a ubiquitous, well-conserved family of calcium-dependent, cysteine proteases. In the MEROPS protease enzyme classification system, they are members of clan CA (papain-like proteases). The calpain proteins are heterodimers consisting of an invariant small subunit and variable large subunits. The large subunit possesses a cysteine protease domain, and both subunits possess calcium-binding domains. Calpains have been implicated in neurodegenerative processes, as their activation can be triggered by calcium influx and oxidative stress. The protein encoded by this gene is highly expressed in the placenta. Its C-terminal region lacks any homology to the calmodulin-like domain of other calpains. The protein lacks a critical catalytic triad residue in its active site (cysteine nucleophile mutated to lysine) and thus is suggested to be proteolytically inactive. The protein may play a role in tumor formation by inhibiting apoptosis and promoting angiogenesis.

References 

Genes on human chromosome X